East Delhi Lok Sabha constituency is one of the 7 Lok Sabha (parliamentary) constituencies in the Indian National Capital Territory of Delhi. This constituency came into existence in 1966. It presently comprises 40 municipal wards of the Municipal Corporation of Delhi with approximately 16 lakh voters and a population of approx 25 lakhs.

East Delhi is one of the larger and highly populated Lok Sabha constituencies not only in Delhi but all over India. The constituency covers areas east of the Yamuna and has a large population, including Seelampur, Shahdara, Gandhi Nagar and Preet Vihar. The current MP from here is Gautam Gambhir.

Assembly segments
Following the delimitation of the parliamentary constituencies, since 2008, it comprises the following Delhi Vidhan Sabha segments:

From 1993 to 2008, it comprised the following Delhi Vidhan Sabha segments: Trilokpuri, Patparganj, Mandawali, Geeta Colony, Gandhi Nagar, Krishna Nagar, Vishwas Nagar, Shahdara, Seemapuri, Nand Nagari, Rohtas Nagar, Babarpur, Seelampur, Ghonda, Yamuna Vihar, Qarawal Nagar, Wazirpur, Nerela (Polling stations 1-64 and 70-97), Bhalswa Jahangirpur (Polling stations 3-163), Adarsh Nagar, Timarpur (Polling stations 46, 97-101) and Model Town (Polling stations 103-113)

From 1966 to 1993, the constituency comprised the following Delhi Metropolitan Council segments: Wazirabad, Narela, Gita Colony, Gandhi Nagar, Krishan Nagar, Shahdara, Rohtas Nagar and Ghonda

Members of Parliament
The East Delhi Lok Sabha constituency was created in 1967. The list of Member of Parliament (MP) is as follows:

Election results

17th Lok Sabha: 2019 General Elections

16th Lok Sabha: 2014 General Elections

15th Lok Sabha: 2009 General Elections

14th Lok Sabha: 2004 General Elections

13th Lok Sabha: 1999 General Elections

12th Lok Sabha: 1998 General Elections

11th Lok Sabha: 1997 By-Election

11th Lok Sabha: 1996 General Elections

10th Lok Sabha: 1991 General Elections

9th Lok Sabha: 1989 General Elections

8th Lok Sabha: 1984 General Elections

7th Lok Sabha: 1980 General Elections

6th Lok Sabha: 1977 General Elections

5th Lok Sabha: 1971 General Elections

4th Lok Sabha: 1967 General Elections

See also
 List of Constituencies of the Lok Sabha
 Outer Delhi (Lok Sabha constituency)

References

Lok Sabha constituencies in Delhi
1966 establishments in Delhi
Constituencies established in 1966